Ádám Hrepka (born 15 April 1987 in Szeged) is a Hungarian football player playing for MTK Budapest FC. He is a striker and has also played for the Hungary national team.

Club career
Born in Szeged, Csongrád in Southern Hungary, Hrepka was with local side Szeged, before joining Újpest where he stayed until 2004 as a youth player. In 2004, he joined Hungarian National Championship I side MTK Hungária, making nine appearances and scoring two goals in his first season. In 2005–06 he scored twelve goals in 24 appearances, and a further 11 goals in 27 appearances the following season as MTK finished as runners-up in the league.

He spent a short time in 2007–08 on loan at Dutch Eredivisie club, NEC, making seven appearances. He also made 17 appearances back at MTK, scoring twice, as the club won the league title. He then made 27 appearances, scoring five goals in 2008–09. On 8 October 2008 he scored all four goals in MTK's 4–2 victory over Kaposvári Rákóczi in the 1st leg and added two more in the 6–1 win in the 2nd leg of their Hungarian Cup, Round 5 tie.

In the 2009–10 season Hrepka was loaned to Budapest Honvéd. In late-January 2010, during the league's winter break, he was linked with a move to English Championship club Blackpool. MTK confirmed on 24 January on the club's official website that Hrepka had travelled to Blackpool to discuss a possible move.

International career
Hrekpa has made three appearances for Hungary.

Honours
MTK Hungária
 Hungarian National Championship I champion: 2007–08
 Hungarian National Championship I runner-up: 2006–07

References

External links
Data page at magyarfutball.hu

Hungarian Professional Footballers Association (HLSZ) profile

1987 births
Living people
Sportspeople from Szeged
Association football forwards
Hungarian footballers
Hungary international footballers
Szeged LC footballers
Újpest FC players
MTK Budapest FC players
NEC Nijmegen players
Budapest Honvéd FC players
Vasas SC players
Paksi FC players
Bnei Yehuda Tel Aviv F.C. players
Monori SE players
Budapesti VSC footballers
Szombathelyi Haladás footballers
Nemzeti Bajnokság I players
Nemzeti Bajnokság II players
Eredivisie players
Israeli Premier League players
Hungarian expatriate footballers
Expatriate footballers in the Netherlands
Expatriate footballers in Israel
Hungarian expatriate sportspeople in the Netherlands
Hungarian expatriate sportspeople in Israel